Tao Pun is a neighbourhood in Bangkok.

Tao Pun or Tao Poon may also refer to these places in Thailand:

Tao Pun subdistrict in Song district, Phrae
Tao Pun subdistrict in Photharam district, Ratchaburi
Tao Pun subdistrict in Kaeng Khoi district, Saraburi
Ko Tao Pun, an island in Ko Samui district, Surat Thani
Tao Poon MRT station, a rapid transit station in Bangkok